Canadian Thoracic Society (CTS) is a national not-for-profit medical association representing researchers and healthcare professionals in the field of respirology. It was established when the Canadian Tuberculosis Association, now The Lung Association, recognized the need for a medical association as evidenced by the increase in attendance of both medical and non-medical members at the annual meetings.

History 
In September 2021, CTS called for legislation to require healthcare workers to receive a COVID-19 vaccine as a condition of continued employment. The position paper published by CTS urged "all levels of government" across Canada to mandate full vaccination, stating it was the most effective way to prevent against serious illness and death from COVID-19.

Activities 
CTS publishes clinical practice guidelines (CPG) for care of various respiratory conditions including asthma and chronic obstructive pulmonary disease (COPD).

Organization 
CTS is led by a board of directors and executive committee. Leadership for the 2022-2023 fiscal year include:

Board of Directors and Executive Committee 

 Richard Leigh, President - University of Calgary
 Paul Hernandez, Past President - Dalhousie University
 Mohit Bhutani, President-elect - University of Alberta
 Donna Goodridge, Treasurer - University of Saskatchewan
 Melinda Solomon, Secretary - SickKids/University of Toronto
 Jean Bourdeau, Chair of Business Development - McGill University
 Dina Brooks, Chair of Long-term Planning - McMaster University
 David Gourde, Chair of Canadian Respiratory Health Professionals - Centre intégré universitaire de santé et de services sociaux du Nord-de-l’Île-de-Montréal
 Samir Gupta, Chair of the Canadian Respiratory Guidelines Committee - University of Toronto
 Christopher Hergott, Chair of Education & Continuing Professional Development - University of Calgary
 Larry Lands, Chair of Research - McGill University
 Christopher Li, Chair of Memberships & Communications - University of Toronto
 David Zielinski, Pediatric Assembly Representative - Montreal Children's Hospital/McGill University Health Centre

See also
 Registered Respiratory Therapist
 American College of Chest Physicians
 American Thoracic Society
 Canadian COPD Alliance
 Canadian Respiratory Health Professionals
 Canadian Society of Allergy and Clinical Immunology
 European Respiratory Society
 Guidelines International Network
 Provincial Thoracic Societies

References

Pulmonology and respiratory therapy organizations
Medical associations based in Canada